Statistics of American Soccer League II in season 1935–36.

Metropolitan Division

New England Division

In mid-September 1935, Sam Fletcher, President of the New England Division, announced that the league would be dormant for the season after a number of teams withdrew.

References

American Soccer League (1933–1983) seasons
1935–36 in American soccer